Bicyclus mahale is a butterfly in the family Nymphalidae. It is found in south-western Tanzania. The habitat consists of dense forests at altitudes between 800 and 1,000 meters.

Adults are attracted to fermenting bananas.

References

Elymniini
Butterflies described in 1998
Endemic fauna of Tanzania
Butterflies of Africa